Jessie Dellosa (born January 20, 1957) is a retired Filipino general officer and a former Chief of staff of the Philippine Armed Forces. His former commands include the Northern Luzon Command and 2nd Infantry Division. He was deputy commander of Central Command in the Visayas and Commandant of the Philippine Military Academy. On 12 December 2011, President Benigno Aquino III chose Dellosa as his AFP chief.

Background

Dellosa was born in Bacon, Sorsogon and grew up in Lucena City where he finished his elementary and secondary education. As a military officer, his other positions prior to his post as Northern Luzon Command (NolCom) commander include: Commanding General of the 2nd Infantry Division, Deputy Commander of Central Command in Visayas, Commandant of Cadets at the Philippine Military Academy.

Dellosa is a member of Philippine Military Academy “Matapat” Class of 1979. He was the commander of the NolCom prior to his appointment as chief of staff.

He was also the Group Commander of the Special Operation Task Group “Sulu” instrumental in the neutralization of Abu Sayyaf leader Abu Solaiman and the release of the Burnham couple in 2007.

He was also the commanding officer of the Special Reaction Unit of the Presidential Security Group during the time of President Corazon Aquino.

AFP Chief of staff
On December 12, 2011, Philippine President Benigno Aquino III appointed Dellosa as chief of the Philippine Armed Forces. The president, in introducing his new Military Chief, said, "He is a true warrior... General Dellosa, do not turn your back on the mandate of the people”

War against corruption
Armed Forces Chief Jessie D. Dellosa has declared an “all-out war against graft and corruption” during the change of command ceremony at Camp Aguinaldo on December 12, 2011. He said that, “An all-out war against graft and corruption and against few organizational misfits will free us from the seemingly never-ending corruption issue in the military,”

Awards
  Philippine Republic Presidential Unit Citation
   Distinguished Service Star
   Gold Cross (Philippines)
  Outstanding Achievement Medal
   Gawad sa Kaunlaran
   Bronze Cross Medal
   Military Merit Medal (Philippines)
   Silver Wing Medal
   Military Commendation Medal
  Wounded Personnel Medal
  Military Civic Action Medal
  Long Service Medal
  Anti-Dissidence Campaign Medal
  Luzon Anti Dissidence Campaign Medal
  Visayas Anti-Dissidence Campaign Medal
  Mindanao Anti-dissidence Campaign Medal
  Disaster Relief & Rehabilitation Operation Ribbon
  Scout Ranger Qualification Badge
  Special Forces Qualification Badge
  Ranger tab

References

Living people
Filipino generals
1957 births
Chairmen of the Joint Chiefs (Philippines)
People from Sorsogon
People from Lucena, Philippines
Benigno Aquino III administration personnel
Philippine Military Academy alumni
Recipients of the Philippine Republic Presidential Unit Citation
Recipients of the Distinguished Service Star
Recipients of the Gold Cross (Philippines)
Recipients of the Outstanding Achievement Medal
Recipients of the Bronze Cross Medal
Recipients of the Military Merit Medal (Philippines)
Recipients of the Silver Wing Medal
Recipients of the Military Commendation Medal
Recipients of the Military Civic Action Medal